Claire Rochecouste is an Australian career officer with the Department of Foreign Affairs and Trade.  She served as the Australian Ambassador to Portugal, Cabo Verde, Guinea-Bissau, and São Tomé and Príncipe between 2019 and 2022. Before that, she was the Director of the Levant and Iran Section.

Rochecouste earned a Master in Public Administration from the Harvard Kennedy School (attended with a "prestigious RG Menzies Scholarship to Harvard for 2017"), Bachelor of Business from Monash University and Bachelor of Arts from the University of Melbourne.

References

Ambassadors of Australia to Portugal
Ambassadors of Australia to Cape Verde
Ambassadors of Australia to Guinea-Bissau
Ambassadors of Australia to São Tomé and Príncipe
Harvard Kennedy School alumni
Australian women ambassadors
Year of birth missing (living people)
Living people
Monash University alumni
University of Melbourne alumni